O-phospho-L-seryl-tRNASec:L-selenocysteinyl-tRNA synthase (MMPSepSecS, SepSecS, SLA/LP, O-phosphoseryl-tRNA:selenocysteinyl-tRNA synthase, O-phospho-L-seryl-tRNA:L-selenocysteinyl-tRNA synthase) is an enzyme with systematic name selenophosphate:O-phospho-L-seryl-tRNASec selenium transferase. This enzyme catalyses the following chemical reaction

 O-phospho-L-seryl-tRNASec + selenophosphate   L-selenocysteinyl-tRNASec + phosphate

This enzyme is pyridoxal-phosphate protein.

References

External links 
 

EC 2.9.1